Jaana Ehmcke (born 18 May 1987, in Bremen) is a German swimmer. She is trained by Jörg Hoffmann. In 2006, she took part in the European Short Course Swimming Championships in Helsinki. She also represented Germany in the women's 400 metre and 800 metre freestyle swimming races at the 2008 Summer Olympics in Beijing.

References

1987 births
Sportspeople from Bremen
German female swimmers
Olympic swimmers of Germany
Swimmers at the 2008 Summer Olympics
Living people
German female freestyle swimmers
20th-century German women
21st-century German women